NORC was a street view website introduced in 2009 for Central and Eastern Europe. The site provided 360-degree panoramas from various cities and locations in Austria, Czech Republic, Hungary, Poland, Romania, Russia, and Slovakia. It is owned by a software company called eXtreme Soft Group, seated in Bucharest, Romania.

The sites seems to be down since early November 2013.

Areas included

Updates and new data
Currently there is no data from Norc about when and/or where updates will be available.
The latest new panoramas were published in September 2009, showing cities mostly linked with ski resorts in Austrian lands of Tirol, Vorarlberg and Salzburg. In January 2011 the street view service for Russia was discontinued. Whether this is temporary or permanent, Norc Russia, operated by the name mappi.ru, does not specify.

References

Street view services